Iodic acid is a white water-soluble solid with the chemical formula . Its robustness contrasts with the instability of chloric acid and bromic acid. Iodic acid features iodine in the oxidation state +5 and is one of the most stable oxo-acids of the halogens. When heated, samples dehydrate to give iodine pentoxide. On further heating, the iodine pentoxide further decomposes, giving a mix of iodine, oxygen and lower oxides of iodine.

Preparation
Iodic acid can be produced by oxidizing iodine  with strong oxidizers such as nitric acid , chlorine , chloric acid  or hydrogen peroxide , for example:

I2 + 6 H2O + 5Cl2 <=> 2 HIO3 + 10 HCl

Structure
Iodic acid crystallises from acidic solution as orthorhombic α- in space group P212121. The structure consists of pyramidal molecules linked by hydrogen bonding and intermolecular iodine-oxygen interactions. The I=O bond lengths are 1.81 Å while the I–OH distance is 1.89 Å. Several other polymorphs have been reported, including an orthorhombic γ form in space group Pbca and an orthorhombic δ form in space group P212121. All of the polymorphs contain pyramidal molecules, hydrogen bonding and I···O interactions, but differ in packing arrangement.

Properties
Iodic acid is a relatively strong acid with a pKa of 0.75. It is strongly oxidizing in acidic solution, less so in basic solution. When iodic acid acts as oxidizer, then the product of the reaction is either iodine, or iodide ion. Under some special conditions (very low pH and high concentration of chloride ions, such as in concentrated hydrochloric acid), iodic acid is reduced to iodine trichloride, a golden yellow compound in solution and no further reduction occurs. In the absence of chloride ions, when there is an excess amount of reductant, then all iodate is converted to iodide ion. When there is an excess amount of iodate, then part of the iodate is converted to iodine. It may be used in preparation of ionization to form alkyl halides.

Uses
Iodic acid is used as a strong acid in analytical chemistry. It may be used to standardize solutions of both weak and strong bases, using methyl red or methyl orange as the indicator.

Use in salt industry
Iodic acid can be used to synthesize sodium or potassium iodate for increasing iodine content of salt.

Other oxyacids
Iodate is part of a series of oxyacids in which iodine can assume oxidation states of −1, +1, +3, +5, or +7. A number of neutral iodine oxides are also known.

References

Analytical standards
Halogen oxoacids
Hydrogen compounds
Iodates
Iodine compounds
Mineral acids
Oxidizing acids
Oxidizing agents